Christian prayer is an important activity in Christianity, and there are several different forms used for this practice.

Christian prayers are diverse: they can be completely spontaneous, or read entirely from a text, such as from a breviary, which contains the canonical hours that are said at fixed prayer times. While praying, certain gestures usually accompany the prayers, including folding one's hands, bowing one's head, kneeling (often in the kneeler of a pew in corporate worship or in the kneeler of a prie-dieu in private worship), and prostration.

The most common prayer among Christians is the "Lord's Prayer", which according to the gospel accounts (e.g. Matthew 6:9-13) is how Jesus taught his disciples to pray. The early Christians thus came to recite the Lord's Prayer thrice a day at 9 am, 12 pm, and 3 pm, supplanting the former Amidah predominant in the Hebrew tradition; as such, in Christianity, many Lutheran and Anglican churches ring their church bells from belltowers three times a day: in the morning, at noon and in the evening summoning the Christian faithful to recite the Lord’s Prayer.

From the time of the early Church, the practice of seven fixed prayer times have been taught; in Apostolic Tradition, Hippolytus instructed Christians to pray seven times a day "on rising, at the lighting of the evening lamp, at bedtime, at midnight" and "the third, sixth and ninth hours of the day, being hours associated with Christ's Passion." Church bells enjoin Christians to pray at these hours. Before praying, they wash their hands and face in order to be clean before and present their best to God; shoes are removed in order to acknowledge that one is offering prayer before a holy God. In these Christian denominations, and in many others as well, it is customary for women to wear a Christian headcovering when praying. Many Christians have historically hung a Christian cross on the eastern wall of their houses to indicate the eastward direction of prayer during these seven prayer times.

There are two basic settings for Christian prayer: corporate (or public) and private. Corporate prayer includes prayer shared within the worship setting or other public places, especially on the Lord's Day on which many Christian assemble collectively. These prayers can be formal written prayers, such as the liturgies contained in the Lutheran Service Book and Book of Common Prayer, as well as informal ejaculatory prayers or extemporaneous prayers, such as those offered in Methodist camp meetings. Private prayer occurs with the individual praying either silently or aloud within the home setting; the use of a daily devotional and prayer book in the private prayer life of a Christian is common. In Western Christianity, the prie-dieu has been historically used for the purpose of private prayer and many Christian homes possess home altars in the area where these are placed. In Eastern Christianity, believers often keep icon corners at which they pray, which are on the eastern wall of the house. Among Old Ritualists, a prayer rug known as a Podruchnik is used to keep one's face and hands clean during prostrations, as these parts of the body are used to make the sign of the cross. Spontaneous prayer in Christianity, often done in private settings, follows the basic form of adoration, contrition, thanksgiving and supplication, abbreviated as A.C.T.S.

Historical development

New Testament

Prayer in the New Testament is presented as a positive command. The people of God are challenged to include prayer in their everyday life, even in the busy struggles of marriage as it is thought to bring the faithful closer to God. Throughout the New Testament, prayer is shown to be God's appointed method by which the faithful obtain what he has to bestow. Prayer, according to the Book of Acts, can be seen at the first moments of the church. The apostles regarded prayer as an essential part of their lives.

Lengthy passages of the New Testament are prayers or canticles (see also the Book of Odes), such as the prayer for forgiveness, the Lord's Prayer, the Magnificat, the Benedictus, Jesus' prayer to the one true God, exclamations such as, "Praise be to the God and Father of our Lord Jesus Christ", the Believers' Prayer, "may this cup be taken from me", "Pray that you will not fall into temptation", Stephen's Prayer, Simon Magus' Prayer, "pray that we may be delivered from wicked and evil men", and Maranatha.

Early Christianity
Prayer and the reading of Scripture were important elements of Early Christianity. In the early Church worship was inseparable from doctrine as reflected in the statement: lex orandi, lex credendi, i.e. the law of belief is the law of prayer. Early Christian liturgies highlight the importance of prayer.

The Lord's Prayer was an essential element in the meetings held by the very early Christians, and it was spread by them as they preached Christianity in new lands. Over time, a variety of prayers were developed as the production of early Christian literature intensified.

As early as the 2nd century, Christians indicated the eastward direction of prayer by placing a Christian cross on the eastern wall of their house or church, prostrating in front of it as they prayed at seven fixed prayer times.

By the 3rd century Origen had advanced the view of "Scripture as a sacrament". Origen's methods of interpreting Scripture and praying on them were learned by Ambrose of Milan, who towards the end of the 4th century taught them to Augustine of Hippo, thereby introducing them into the monastic traditions of the Western Church thereafter.

Early models of Christian monastic life emerged in the 4th century, as the Desert Fathers began to seek God in the deserts of Palestine and Egypt. These early communities gave rise to the tradition of a Christian life of "constant prayer" in a monastic setting which eventually resulted in meditative practices in the Eastern Church during the Byzantine period.

Meditation in the Middle Ages

During the Middle Ages, the monastic traditions of both Western and Eastern Christianity moved beyond vocal prayer to Christian meditation. These progressions resulted in two distinct and different meditative practices: Lectio Divina in the West and hesychasm in the East. Hesychasm involves the repetition of the Jesus Prayer, but Lectio Divina uses different Scripture passages at different times and although a passage may be repeated a few times, Lectio Divina is not repetitive in nature.

In the Western Church, by the 6th century, Benedict of Nursia and Pope Gregory I had initiated the formal methods of scriptural prayer called Lectio Divina. With the motto Ora et labora (i.e. pray and work), daily life in a Benedictine monastery consisted of three elements: liturgical prayer, manual labor and Lectio Divina, a quiet prayerful reading of the Bible. This slow and thoughtful reading of Scripture, and the ensuing pondering of its meaning, was their meditation.

Early in the 12th century, Bernard of Clairvaux was instrumental in re-emphasizing the importance of Lectio Divina within the Cistercian order. Bernard also emphasized the role of the Holy Spirit in contemplative prayer and compared it to a kiss by the Eternal Father which allows a union with God.

The progression from Bible reading, to meditation, to loving regard for God, was first formally described by Guigo II, a Carthusian monk who died late in the 12th century. Guigo II's book The Ladder of Monks is considered the first description of methodical prayer in the western mystical tradition.

In Eastern Christianity, the monastic traditions of "constant prayer" that traced back to the Desert Fathers and Evagrius Pontikos established the practice of hesychasm and influenced John Climacus' book The Ladder of Divine Ascent by the 7th century. These meditative prayers were promoted and supported by Gregory Palamas in the 14th century.

Contemplative prayer
In the Western Church, during the 15th century, reforms of the clergy and monastic settings were undertaken by the two Venetians, Lorenzo Giustiniani and Louis Barbo. Both men considered methodical prayer and meditation as essential tools for the reforms they were undertaking. Barbo, who died in 1443, wrote a treatise on prayer titled Forma orationis et meditionis otherwise known as Modus meditandi. He described three types of prayer; vocal prayer, best suited for beginners; meditation, oriented towards those who are more advanced; and contemplation as the highest form of prayer, only obtainable after the meditation stage. Based on the request of Pope Eugene IV, Barbo introduced these methods to Valladolid, Spain and by the end of the 15th century they were being used at the abbey of Montserrat. These methods then influenced Garcias de Cisneros, who in turn influenced Ignatius of Loyola.

The Eastern Orthodox Church has a similar three level hierarchy of prayer. The first level prayer is again vocal prayer, the second level is meditation (also called "inward prayer" or "discursive prayer") and the third level is contemplative prayer in which a much closer relationship with God is cultivated.

Types of prayer 
Christian prayer can be divided into different categories, varying by denomination and tradition. Over time, theologians have studied different types of prayer. For example, theologian Gilbert W. Stafford divided prayer into eight different types based on New Testament scripture.  Interpretations of prayer in the New Testament and the Christian faith as a whole widely vary, leading to the practice of different types of prayer.

Daily prayer

Canonical hours

In Apostolic Tradition, Hippolytus instructed Christians to pray seven times a day "on rising, at the lighting of the evening lamp, at bedtime, at midnight" and "the third, sixth and ninth hours of the day, being hours associated with Christ's Passion."

These Christians incorporate prostrations in their prayers, "prostrating three times in the name of the Trinity; at the end of each Psalm … while saying the ‘Alleluia’; and multiple times during the more than forty Kyrie eleisons" as with the Copts and thrice during the Qauma prayer, at the words "Crucified for us, Have mercy on us!", thrice during the recitation of the Nicene Creed at the words "And was incarnate of the Holy Spirit...", "And was crucified for us...", & "And on the third day rose again...", as well as thrice during the Prayer of the Cherubim while praying the words "Blessed is the glory of the Lord, from His place forever!" as with the Indians. Before praying, Oriental Christians wash their hands, face and feet out of respect for God; shoes are removed in order to acknowledge that one is offering prayer before a holy God. In this Christian denomination, and in many others as well, it is customary for women to wear a Christian headcovering when praying.

In the Lutheran Churches, the canonical hours are contained in breviaries such as The Brotherhood Prayer Book and For All the Saints: A Prayer Book for and by the Church, while in the Roman Catholic Church they are known as the Liturgy of the Hours. The Methodist tradition has emphasized the praying of the canonical hours as an "essential practice" in being a disciple of Jesus.

Lord's Prayer 
The early Christians came to pray the Lord's Prayer thrice a day at 9 am, 12 pm and 3 pm, supplanting the former Amidah predominant in the Hebrew tradition. As such, in Christianity, many Lutheran and Anglican churches ring their church bells from belltowers three times a day, summoning the Christian faithful to recite the Lord’s Prayer.

Sign of the Cross

The sign of the cross is a short prayer used daily by many Christians, especially those of the Catholic, Lutheran, Oriental Orthodox, Eastern Orthodox, Methodist and Anglican traditions apart from its daily use in private prayer, it is widely used in corporate prayer by these Christian denominations. The Small Catechism, a catechism used in the Lutheran Churches, instructs believers "to make the sign of the cross at both the beginning and the end of the day as a beginning to daily prayers." It specifically instructs Christians: "When you get out of bed, bless yourself with the holy cross and say ‘In the name of God, the Father, the Son, and the Holy Spirit. Amen.’"

Mealtime prayer

Christians often pray to ask God to thank Him for and bless their food before consuming it at the time of eating meals, such as supper. These prayers vary per Christian denomination, e.g. the common table prayer is used by communicants of the Lutheran Churches and the Moravian Church.

Seasonal prayer 
Many denominations use specific prayers geared to the season of the Christian Liturgical Year, such as  Advent, Christmas, Lent and Easter.  Some of these prayers are found in the Roman Breviary, the Liturgy of the Hours, the Orthodox Book of Needs, Evangelical Lutheran Worship, and the Anglican Book of Common Prayer.

In the seasons of Advent and Lent, many Christians add the reading of a daily devotional to their prayer life; items that aid in prayer, such as an Advent wreath or Lenten calendar are unique to those seasons of the Church Year.

Intercession of saints
The ancient church, in both Eastern Christianity and Western Christianity, developed a tradition of asking for the intercession of (deceased) saints, and this remains the practice of most Eastern Orthodox, Oriental Orthodox, Roman Catholic, as well as some Lutheran and Anglican churches. Most of the Reformed Churches however rejected this practice, largely on the basis of belief in the sole mediatorship of Christ.

Meditation and contemplative prayer

A broad, three stage characterization of prayer begins with vocal prayer, then moves on to a more structured form in terms of meditation, then reaches the multiple layers of contemplation, or intercession.

Christian meditation is a structured attempt to get in touch with and deliberately reflect upon the revelations of God. The word meditation comes from the Latin word meditārī, which has a range of meanings including to reflect on, to study and to practice. Christian meditation is the process of deliberately focusing on specific thoughts (such as a bible passage) and reflecting on their meaning in the context of the love of God.

Christian meditation aims to heighten the personal relationship based on the love of God that marks Christian communion.

At times there may be no clear-cut boundary between Christian meditation and Christian contemplation, and they overlap. Meditation serves as a foundation on which the contemplative life stands, the practice by which someone begins the state of contemplation. In contemplative prayer, this activity is curtailed, so that contemplation has been described as "a gaze of faith", "a silent love".

Meditation and contemplation on the life of Jesus in the New Testament are components of the rosary and are central to spiritual retreats and to the prayer that grows out of these retreats.

Intercessory prayer
This kind of prayer involves the believer taking the role of an intercessor, praying on behalf of another individual, group or community, or even a nation.

Ejaculatory prayer
Ejaculatory prayer is the use of very brief exclamations. Saint Augustine remarked that the Egyptian Christians who withdrew to a solitary life "are said to say frequent prayers, but very brief ones that are tossed off as in a rush, so that a vigilant and keen intention, which is very necessary for one who prays, may not fade away and grow dull over longer periods".

Examples of such prayers are given in the old Raccolta under the numbers 19, 20, 38, 57, 59, 63, 77, 82, 83, 133, 154, 166, 181.

They are also known as aspirations, invocations or exclamations and include the Jesus Prayer.

Johnson's Dictionary defined "ejaculation" as "a short prayer darted out occasionally, without solemn retirement". Such pious ejaculations are part also of the liturgy of the Church of England.

Listening prayer
Listening prayer is a type of Christian  prayer.  As compared with the traditional Christian prayer, the listening prayer method demands "hearing and discerning God's voice through prayer and scripture; then obeying the Lord's direction in personal ministry."

Traditional Christian prayer requested people to thank  God, as well as tell God their own request.  When their prayers seemed unanswered, some would feel that God did not hear them or did not respond to them.  Listening prayer asks: "Was it that God did not respond to you, or was it that you did not hear from God"?  Listening prayer requires those praying to calm their minds down and read the Scripture.  During the reading, some sentences may pop into mind, as if in answer to their prayers but listening prayers are also of two types one is normally listening to church father and second is prayer with music nowadays prayer with music is considered as prayer music or prayer song.

Child's prayer
A Christian child's prayer is typically short, rhyming, or has a memorable tune. It is usually said before bedtime, to give thanks for a meal, or as a nursery rhyme. Many of these prayers are either quotes from the Bible, or set traditional texts.

Prayer books and tools

Prayer books as well as tools such as prayer beads such as chaplets are used by Christians. Images and icons are also associated with prayers in some Christian denominations.

There is no one prayerbook containing a set liturgy used by all Christians; however many Christian denominations have their own local prayerbooks, for example:
Agpeya also known as the Book of Hours for the Coptic Orthodox Christians of Egypt. The book is a collection of texts from the gospels, epistles and most importantly the book of Psalms as well as ancient prayers of the Church Fathers; seven main prayers are distributed over the seven fixed prayer times of the day with relevant texts about every particular hour from the Bible.
Agenda, name for book for liturgies, especially in Lutheran Church.
Book of Common Prayer (the traditional Anglican prayer book, still in use or modified by the constituent churches of the Anglican Communion, and one of the most influential prayerbooks in the English language)
Shehimo, the breviary of the Indian Orthodoxy containing the canonical hours for the seven fixed prayer times of the day
The Book of Psalms
 The Raccolta book of indulgenced prayers for Catholics
The Roman Breviary (Traditional Roman Catholic Monastic Hours)

See also

Christian mysticism
Intercession
Roman Catholic prayer
Roman Catholic prayers to Jesus

References and footnotes

Further reading

 Carroll, James. Prayer from Where We Are. In series, Witness Book[s], 13, and also in Christian Experience Series. Dayton, Ohio: G.A. Pflaum, 1970.

External links
Agpeya: Coptic Book of Hours (used for Daily Prayer in Oriental Orthodox Christianity)
Daily Prayer (used in the Church of England, mother church of the Anglican Communion)
 
 
 (Free eBooks and audio books)
 

 
Spiritual practice
Prayer